The 1968–69 Los Angeles Stars season was the first season of the franchise in Los Angeles in the American Basketball Association (ABA). The team had been bought by construction businessman Jim Kirst in the summer of 1968, and were subsequently moved to the city of Los Angeles, to play in Los Angeles Sports Arena, with a new head coach and a roster that dispatched most of the Amigo lineup from the previous year. On October 30, 1968, the Stars played the New Orleans Buccaneers, losing 112–109 to a crowd of 3,700. The Stars ended up finishing 5th place in the Western Division, finishing 8 games behind the 4th place Chaparrals.

Roster 
 32 Brian Brunkhorst - Forward 
 20 Steve Chubin - Shooting guard
 55 Warren Davis - Power forward
 35 Dennis Grey - Center
 42 Elvin Ivory - Forward
 10 Mervin Jackson - Point guard
 20 Jim Jarvis - Point guard
 50 Ed Johnson - Center
 22 Edgar Lacy - Small forward
 12 George Lehmann - Point guard
 14 Jay Miller - Small forward
 44 Larry Miller - Shooting guard
 33 George Stone - Small forward
 40 Ben Warley - Small forward
 21 Bob Warren - Shooting guard
 14 Mike LaRoche - Shooting guard (DNP; released after two games)

Final standings

Western Division

C - ABA Champions

Awards and honors
1969 ABA All-Star Game selections (game played on January 28, 1969)
 Warren Davis
 Mervin Jackson

References

External links
 RememberTheABA.com 1968–69 regular season and playoff results
 Los Angeles page

Los Angeles Stars
Los Angeles Stars, 1968-69
Los Angeles Stars, 1968-69
Los Angeles Stars seasons